Shabik'eshchee Village is an archeological site located atop Chacra Mesa, New Mexico. Covering , the pit-house settlement was occupied  by Basketmaker III peoples. Discovered by Frank Roberts in 1926, the site is one of the earliest settlements in Chaco Canyon. Shabik'eshchee Village contained one hundred pit houses and a community great kiva.

References

Bibliography

Archaeological sites in New Mexico
Chaco Canyon
Chaco Culture National Historical Park
Colorado Plateau
Ancestral Puebloans